Out of Touch in the Wild is the third studio album by English indie rock band Dutch Uncles. It was recorded over a two-week period in January 2012.

Track listing

References

2013 albums
Dutch Uncles albums
Memphis Industries albums